The Kaohsiung City Lingya Sports Center, originally the Chung Cheng Martial Arts Stadium, is a sports center in Lingya District, Kaohsiung, Taiwan. The stadium was one of the venues for the World Games 2009.

History
The stadium was originally constructed for the 1986 National Games.

Structure
The stadium is separated into the Eastern and Western Zone with three halls in each of them of an area 620 m2 each. The audience stage can accommodate 1,400 people each with a total capacity of 7,000 seats.

Transportation
The sports center is accessible from exit 4 of the Martial Arts Stadium Station of the Kaohsiung MRT.

See also
 List of stadiums in Taiwan

References

External links
  

Lingya District
Martial art halls in Taiwan
Sports venues in Kaohsiung